One Epic Game is a 2011 endless runner video game developed and published by Czech company Grip Games. The game was released in July and August 2011 for PlayStation 3, PlayStation Portable, PlayStation Vita, iOS and Android. The game is a parody of multiple video game and movie clichés.

Gameplay 
The player controls an infinity running character, who can only jump and shoot. Jumping helps him avoid obstacles and traps while shooting kills enemies. The player can also kill enemies by jumping on their heads. There are multiple game modes in the game. The main mode is the story mode. There are a series of missions with the story running throughout them. There is a task in every mission (for example, travelling 1000 metres, getting to end of a level with only one life or killing a certain number of enemies). Every mission is set in one of five worlds - Zombie Outbreak, Nuclear Wasteland, World War II, Alien Invasion and Fantasy Kingdom. The story is told in the form of comic scenes.

Another mode is Free Run. In this mode the player chooses a world and then tries to get the highest possible score.

The last mode is Challenges. Here, the player chooses a task and then tries to complete it. He can also choose the difficulty level. For the easiest difficulty level, he wins a bronze medal, while for the hardest, he wins a gold medal.

There are multiple weapons in the game. The player starts with a Pistol. He can also acquire another weapon along the way, for example a Shotgun, Machine gun, Rocket launcher, Flamethrower or Laser. Every weapon works differently. When a player is hurt, they lose any weapon they may have acquired during the course of the game and will have to fight with a pistol again. The player can only ever carry one weapon. The player can also pick up a Heart, which gives them a life, or a jetpack, which allows them to fly. There is a checkpoint every 1000 metres.

Plot 
The story follows Alpha Dog as he fights diabolical Zork, who tries to destroy the world.

Characters 
Alpha Dog - The main character. He is a traditional action hero. His job is to save the world yet is fully aware that he is a video game character.
Zork - The antagonist. He wants to destroy the world.
Mr. P - The US president. He communicates with Alpha Dog and sometimes gives him tasks to complete.

Reception 
The game has received mixed to positive reviews from critics. The PlayStation version currently holds 66% on Metacritic while the IPad version holds 69%. The game was praised for its graphics, replay value and gameplay. Some reviewers praised the humor while others criticised it. The game was also criticised for its story.

References

External links 
Official site

2011 video games
Platform games
Video games developed in the Czech Republic
Parody video games
PlayStation 3 games
PlayStation Portable games
PlayStation Vita games
IOS games
Android (operating system) games
Parodies
Grip Digital games
Single-player video games
Chillingo games